Roseivirga misakiensis is a Gram-negative, aerobic and slightly curved-rod-shaped bacterium from the genus of Roseivirga which has been isolated from coastal surface water of Misaki in Japan.

References

Cytophagia
Bacteria described in 2015